The Eppinger House is a building located at 110 East Oglethorpe Avenue in Savannah, Georgia, United States. It is believed to be the oldest intact brick structure in Georgia, dating to or before 1776. In a survey for Historic Savannah Foundation, Mary Lane Morrison found the building to be of significant status. Originally two storeys, built by John Eppinger Sr., its upper level was added in 1876.

The building was known as Eppinger's Inn, owned by a son of John Eppinger, in its early life, and was a popular meeting place for Colonial statesmen. Revolutionary patriots closed it due to the owner's Tory support.

In January 1784, after the British had left Savannah, the Georgia Legislature held its first meeting in the second-floor Long Room.

It later became the home of American Revolutionary War brigadier general Lachlan McIntosh.

See also
Buildings in Savannah Historic District

References

External links
"General Lachlan McIntosh House, 110 East Oglethorpe, Savannah, Chatham County, GA" - Library of Congress

Houses in Savannah, Georgia
Houses completed in the 18th century
Savannah Historic District